The Redmi 10 is an Android-based smartphone as part of the Redmi series, a sub-brand of Xiaomi Inc. This device was announced on August 18, 2021.

Redmi 10 also has some variants:

 Redmi 10 Prime is Indian variant of Redmi 10 with bigger battery.
 Redmi Note 11 4G is a Chinese variant of Redmi 10 without a depth camera.
 Redmi 10 2022 has a hybrid Dual SIM tray instead full-fledged SIM tray which is in Redmi 10.
 Redmi 10 Prime 2022 is an Indian variant of Redmi 10 2022 with a bigger battery.

Design 
Front made of Gorilla Glass 3. Back and frame are made of plastic.

The design is similar to Chinese Redmi Note 11 series.

On the bottom side there are USB-C port, speaker, and microphone. On the top side there are 3.5mm audio jack, an additional microphone, IR blaster, and a second speaker. On the left side there is a dual SIM tray (SIM1 + SIM 2 or SIM1 + microSD) in 10 2022 or dual SIM tray with microSD(Up to 512GB) slot in other models. On the right side are a volume rocker and a power button with a mounted fingerprint scanner.

Redmi 10 and 10 2022 are available in 3 colors: Pebble White, Carbon Gray and Sea Blue.

Redmi 10 Prime and 10 Prime 2022 are available in 3 colors: Astral White, Phantom Black, and Bifrost Blue.

Redmi Note 11 4G is available in 3 colors: Mysterious Black Realm, Time Monologue (White), and Dream Clear Sky (Blue).

Specifications

Hardware

Chipset 
The smartphone uses the octa-core MediaTek Helio G88 containing 2.2 GHz Cortex-A75 core, 6 1.8 GHz Cortex-A55 core, and a 1 GHz Mali-G52 MC2 GPU, which is a small revision of the MediaTek Helio G85 with 90 Hz @ 1080p+ refresh rate and up to 64 MP camera resolution support.

Display 
Smartphones have a 6.5 in (165,1 mm) IPS LCD display with 1080p+ (2400x1080) resolution (395 ppi with 20:9 aspect ratio), 16M colors, 90 Hz refresh rate and punch hole in upper center.

Battery 
Redmi 10, 10 2022 and Note 11 4G have non-removable 5000 mAh Li-Po battery with when Redmi 10 Prime and 10 Prime 2022 have 6000 mAh. All models support 18W fast charging and 9W reverse charging. The in-box charger has 22.5W power.

Software 
The smartphones were released with MIUI 12.5 based on Android 11 and were updated to MIUI 13 based on Android 12. Redmi 10 is the first Xiaomi smartphone with built-in memory extension feature which extends 1GB to RAM with 64GB and 2GB with 128GB storage.

References

External links 

 
 
 
 
 

Android (operating system) devices
10
Mobile phones with multiple rear cameras
Mobile phones with infrared transmitter
Mobile phones introduced in 2021
Phablets